Suddenly is the debut studio album by American jazz bass-guitarist Marcus Miller, released in 1983.

The album was re-released in 1999.

Track listing
All tracks composed by Marcus Miller except where noted.

"Lovin' You"
"Much Too Much"
"Suddenly" (Miller, Mainor Ramsay)
"Just For You"
"The Only Reason I Live"
"Just What I Needed"
"Let Me Show You"
"Be My Love" (Miller, Luther Vandross)
"Could It Be You"

Personnel
Marcus Miller  – lead and backing vocals, bass guitars, keyboards, guitars, clarinet, drum programming
Ralph MacDonald - percussion
Mike Mainieri - vibraphone 
Yvonne Lewis, Luther Vandross, Tawatha Agee, Brenda White King - backing vocals
David Sanborn - alto saxophone
Buddy Williams, Yogi Horton, Harvey Mason - drums
Nick Moroch - acoustic guitar
Dean Crandall, Lewis Paer - 2-string bass guitar
Eric Bartlett - cello
Anca Nicolau, Carol Pool, Eriko Sato, Guillermo Figueroa, Joanna Jenner, Kineko Barbini, Martha Caplin-Silverman, Naoko Tanaka, Robert Chausow, Ruth Waterman - violin
Maureen Gallagher, Valerie Haywood - viola
Michael Colina - string arrangements on "Just For You" and "Could It Be You"
Technical
Daniel Christopher, Eddie Osario, Michael Morongell, Phil Burnett, Steven Remote, Wayne Yurgelin - assistant engineer
Ray Bardani - recording and mixing engineer
George Holz - front cover photography

References

Marcus Miller albums
1983 debut albums
Albums produced by Marcus Miller
Albums produced by Michael Colina
Warner Records albums